Peter Sodann (born 1 June 1936 in Meissen, Saxony) is a German actor, director and politician. He was the Left Party's nominee for the 2009 presidential election, but was not considered a serious candidate by the German media.

Early life
Sodann was born on 1 June 1936 in Meissen to a working-class family. After training to be a toolmaker, he moved to Leipzig in order to study law. In 1959 he transferred to the Theaterhochschule Leipzig, where he led a cabaret group. The group's performance was deemed subversive by the East German authorities and closed in 1961. Sodann was arrested by the Stasi and spent nine months in prison and was on probation for four years.

Acting career
In 1964 Sodann made his first performance with the Berliner Ensemble. In the following years, he acted and produced plays in Erfurt, Chemnitz and Magdeburg. In 1980, he moved to Halle and for years worked as a director there.

He began acting in television shows during the late 1970s. In 1991 he first appeared in his most famous screen role, Police Commissioner Bruno Ehrlicher, in the long-running crime series Tatort. He remained with the series until November 2007. Since 2007 he has starred in a traveling act "Ost-West-Vis-à-Vis" with CDU politician and former Labor Minister Norbert Blüm.

Political activities
Sodann has been a vocal supporter of the Party of Democratic Socialism (PDS), which in 2007 became the Left Party. In July 2005 he announced his interest in running as a candidate of the PDS in Saxony for the 2005 federal election. However, he later withdrew himself from considering, citing restrictions on media employment for Bundestag politicians.

On 13 October 2008 the Left Party's Bundestag delegation nominated Sodann as their candidate for the 2009 presidential election. As an actor-turned-politician, the German media has compared him (usually as a criticism) to Ronald Reagan and Arnold Schwarzenegger. Since the German president is elected by the Bundesversammlung, in which the vast majority of seats would be held by the Christian Democrats and Social Democrats, Sodann stood little chance of winning. Indeed, he finished third in the election, in which the incumbent Horst Köhler was re-elected.

Personal life
Sodann is currently married to his second wife, Cornelia. He is the father of four children through his first marriage: Tina, Susanne, Franz and Karl.

External links
 Official website
 Peter Sodann at the Internet Movie Database
 "Peter Sodann would be a President for the People" (press release of the Left Party)

References

1936 births
Living people
Theaterhochschule Leipzig alumni
The Left (Germany) politicians
Candidates for President of Germany
German actor-politicians
University of Music and Theatre Leipzig alumni
Officers Crosses of the Order of Merit of the Federal Republic of Germany
German male stage actors
German male television actors
20th-century German male actors
21st-century German male actors